Easaval (Scottish Gaelic: Easabhal) is one of the smallest hills on the island of South Uist in the Outer Hebrides of Scotland, with a height of . It is a small rounded hill located south of Lochboisdale near Pollachar in the southernmost part of South Uist, overlooking the Sound of Barra.

On a clear day one can also see Beinn Mhòr, the highest hill in South Uist, Skye, Rùm, Canna, Eigg and Muck. To the south there are views of Barra, Coll and Tiree, the Isle of Mull, and landmarks on the mainland such as the lighthouse on Ardnamurchan, all the great mainland hills between Glenelg and Ardnamurchan, and the peaks of Beinn Talaidh, Beinn Bhearnach and Dun da Ghaoith.

References 

Marilyns of Scotland
Mountains and hills of the Outer Hebrides
South Uist